C'est arrivé à 36 chandelles is a French film directed by Henri Diamant-Berger, it was released in cinemas on October 16, 1957.

Plot 

A young woman is distraught that she can't marry the man she loves but finds happiness whilst appearing on the French television show  36 chandelles.

Cast 
 Guy Bertil : Hugues, the nephew of the minister
 Jane Sourza : Desjardins - Minister of Youth and Sport
 Brigitte Barbier : Brigitte Magnin

References

External links
 

1957 films
1957 romantic comedy films
1950s romantic musical films
French romantic musical films
French romantic comedy films
1950s French-language films
Films set in France
Films set in Paris
Films shot in France
Films shot in Paris 
Jukebox musical films
Films directed by Henri Diamant-Berger
1950s French films